Berekum East Municipal District is one of the twelve districts in Bono Region, Ghana. Originally it was formerly part of the then-larger Berekum District on 10 March 1989, which was created from the former Berekum-Jaman District Council. It was later upgraded to municipal district assembly status and has been renamed as Berekum Municipal District on 29 February 2008; until the western part of the district was split off to create Berekum West District on 15 March 2018; thus the remaining part has been renamed as Berekum East Municipal District. The municipality is located in the western part of Bono Region and has Berekum as its capital town.

List of settlements

Sources
 
 District: Berekum Municipal District

References

External links
 Berekum Municipal District Official Website

Populated places established in 1989

Bono Region

Districts of Bono Region